A special election was held in  on October 13, 1801 to fill a vacancy left by the resignation of Peter Muhlenberg (DR) on March 3, 1801, prior to the beginning of the 7th Congress.  Muhlenberg had been elected to the Senate.

Election results 

There were no other candidates for the vacant seat.

See also 
 List of special elections to the United States House of Representatives

References 

Pennsylvania 1801 04
Pennsylvania 1801 04
1801 04
Pennsylvania 04
United States House of Representatives 04
United States House of Representatives 1801 04